Mario Alexander Barahona Martínez (born October 3, 1976) is an ex-Honduran politician. A member of the National Party of Honduras, he represents the Francisco Morazan Department and is a deputy of 
the National Congress of Honduras for 2006–2010, and 2010–2014.

He is also the son of the renowned late Pastor and former candidate for deputy of the National Party of Honduras Mario Tomas Barahona.

External links
Profile

Deputies of the National Congress of Honduras
1976 births
Living people
National Party of Honduras politicians
People from Francisco Morazán Department